The Wisconsin Badgers represented the University of Wisconsin in WCHA women's ice hockey during the 2015-16 NCAA Division I women's ice hockey season. The Badgers were unable to win the NCAA tournament for the fifth time in school history.

Offseason

Recruiting

Roster

2015–16 Badgers

2015-16 Schedule

|-
!colspan=12 style="background:red;color:#FFFFFF;"| Regular Season

|-
!colspan=12 style="background:red;color:#FFFFFF;"| WCHA Tournament

|-
!colspan=12 style="background:red;color:#FFFFFF;"| NCAA Tournament

Awards and honors
Ann-Renee Desbiens, WCHA Player of the Week (Recognized for games of November 4–6, 2016) 
Ann-Renee Desbiens, 2016 WCHA Player of the Year 

Ann-Renée Desbiens, Goaltender, Patty Kazmaier Top Three Finalist

Annie Pankowski, Forward, Patty Kazmaier Top Ten Finalist

Mark Johnson, WCHA Coach of the Year

Courtney Burke, Defense, WCHA 1st Team All-Star

Ann-Renée Desbiens, Goaltender, WCHA 1st Team All-Star

Annie Pankowski, Forward, WCHA 1st Team All-Star

Emily Clark, Forward, WCHA 2nd Team All-Star

Jenny Ryan, Defense, WCHA 2nd Team All-Star

Sarah Nurse, Forward, WCHA 3rd Team All-Star

Sam Cogen, Forward, WCHA All-Rookie Team

References

Wisconsin
Wisconsin Badgers women's ice hockey seasons
Wisconsin
Wiscon
Wiscon